Jalaluddin "Surkh-Posh" Bukhari (c. 595-690 AH, 1190 – 1295 CE) was a Sufi saint.

Names
Bukhari, a family name, is derived from the location of his birth city of Bukhara in the ancient administrative region of Bukhara Province Uzbekistan. Bukhari is a Sayyid from the Naqvi denomination, a descendant of the Islamic prophet Muhammad through his grandsons Husayn ibn Ali and Hasan ibn Ali. Bukhari was born as Jalaluddin Haider.

Bukhari was nicknamed Surkh-Posh ("clad in red") because he often wore a red mantle.

Over time, he has been referred to by a number of names and titles: Jalal Ganj; Mir Surkh (Red Leader); Sharrifullah (Noble of Allah); Mir Buzurg (Big Leader); Makhdum-ul-Azam; Jalal Akbar; Azimullah; Sher Shah (Lion King); Jalal Azam and Surkh-Posh Bukhari. With formal honorifics, he is also called Sayyid Jalaluddin; Mir Surkh Bukhari; Shah Mir Surkh-Posh of Bukhara; Pir Jalaluddin Qutub-al-Aqtab; Sayyid Jalal and Sher Shah Sayyid Jalal.

Career

Bukhari's life was spent travelling. As an Islamic missionary, he converted tribes such as the Soomro, Samma, Chadhar, Sial, Daher and the Warar. Bukhari was one of the Chaar Yaar (not to be confused with the Rashidun). The Chaar Yaar were the group of pioneers of the Suhrawardiyya and Chisti Sufi movements of the 13th century. Bukhari founded the "Jalali" order. He converted the Samma, the Sial, the Chadhar, the Daher and the Warar tribes of the Southern Punjab and Sindh.

Some of his followers (mureed) spread to Gujarat. The mureed included Bukhari's grandson, Jahaniyan Jahangasht (d. 1384 CE) who visited Mecca 36 times. In 1134 CE, the Sial followers of Bukhari settled in the community that is now Jhang. Bukhari's descendant, Mehboob Elahi Shah|Mehboob Elahi Naqvi-ul Bukhari Al-Maroof Shah Jewna also moved to Jhang from Kannauj. There is a town in Pakistan in the name of Shah Jewna his descendants are still present in India as well as Pakistan. Many of Bukhari's disciples are buried in Banbhore and Makli Hill near Thatta.

Legendary meetings

Sultan of Delhi
In 642 AH, when Jalaluddin Surkh-Posh Bukhari had begun his missionary work in Uch Shareef, he was visited by Nasiruddin Mahmud of the Delhi Sultanate.

Shah Daulah Shahid
Shah Daulah Shahid, is a Muslim saint who is buried in Bengal. In Bukhara, Bukhari presented Saint Daulah with a pair of  grey pigeons. From Bukhara, Saint Daulah travelled to Bengal where he battled and was killed by the Hindu king of Shahzadpur.

Chengiz Khan
According to legend: Jalaluddin Surkh Posh was on his way to India and met Chengiz Khan, the Mongol conqueror. So forth he tried to convince him to convert to Islam however failed.

His two male issues from his second wife, Fatima, the daughter of Sayyid Qasim Hussein Bukhari, Sayyid Ali and Sayyid Jaffar, are buried in tombs at Bukhara. He brought his son Sayyid Baha-ul-Halim with him to Sindh and then he settled in Uchch in 1244.

Death
In 1244 CE (about 640AH), Bukhari moved to Uch, South Punjab (also known as Uch Sharif after the saint settled there) with his son, Baha-ul-Halim, where he founded a religious school. He died in about 690 AH (1295 CE) and was buried in a small town near Uch.  After his tomb was damaged by flood waters of the Ghaggar-Hakra River, Bukhari's remains were buried in Qattal town. In 1027 AH, Sajjada Nashin Makhdoom Hamid, son of Muhammad Nassir-u-Din, moved Bukhari's remains to their present location in Uch and erected a building over them. In 1770s CE, the tomb was rebuilt by the Nawab of Bahawalpur, Bahawal Khan II.

The tomb is a short way from the cemetery of Uch. It stands on a promontory overlooking the plains and the desert beyond. To one side of the tomb is a mosque decorated with blue tilework. In front of the tomb is a pool. A carved wooden door leads into the room containing Bukhari's coffin. UNESCO describes the site:

Mela Uch Sharif
According to World Monuments Fund, "The ancient city of Uch was one of several metropolises founded by Alexander the Great on his crusade through Central Asia in the late 4th century BC."

The Mela Uch Sharif is a week-long mela (folk festival) held in March – April in Uch. People from southern Punjab come to honour Bukhari's role in spreading Islam. Participants visit Bukhari's tomb and offer Friday prayers at the local mosque which was built by the Abbasids. The mela commemorates the congregation of Sufi saints connected with Bukhari. It aligns with the Hindu calendar month of Chaitra.

Family

Bukhari was born on Friday, the fifth day of the twelfth month (Dhu al-Hijjah) of the year 595 AH, in Bukhara Region, in present-day Uzbekistan. Bukhari was the son of Syed Ali Al-Moeed and the grandson of Syed Ja’far Muhammed Hussain. Bukhari's early education was provided by his father. He was later influenced by Syed Shahjamal Mujarad of Kolhapur State in modern-day India.

Fatima (first wife)
Bukhari's first wife was Syeda Fatima, the daughter of Syed Qasim. Bukhari and Fatima had two children, Ali and Ja’far. In 635 AH, after Fatima's death, Bukhari moved with his two sons from Bukhara to Bhakkar, Punjab. Both their sons Ali and Ja’far are buried in Bukhara. Jafar's son was Abdullah also buried in Bukhara

Zohra (second wife)
In Bhakkar, Bukhari married Bibi Tahirah (Zohra), daughter of Syed Badruddin Bhakkari, the son of Sayyid Muhammad Makki. Zohra and Bukhari had two sons: Sadruddin Mohammed Ghaus (who moved to Punjab) and Bahauddin Mohamed Masoom. Their descendants now live in and around Thatta, Uch (Deogarh) and Lahore. A daughter of Sadruddin Mohammed Ghaus married Jahaniyan Jahangasht.

Bibi Fatima Habiba Saeeda (third wife)
After Zohra's death, Bukhari married the second daughter of Badruddin Bhakkari, Bibi Fatima Habiba Saeeda. They had a son, Ahmed Kabir, who was the father of Jahaniyan Jahangasht and Makhdoom Syed Sadruddin Rajan Qatal Kabir Naqvi Al Bukhari (father of Shah Jewna).  It is mentioned within books of history that Sayyid Badruddin's two brothers Sayyid Maah and Sayyid Shams objected to him marrying his two daughters to Bukhari and exiled Bukhari from Bhakkar. The main reason was due to Bukhari being against Materialism, and wearing inexpensive clothes.

Ancestors and descendants
Bukhari's biography and family history are cited extensively in such works as the Marat-e-Jalali, the Mazher-i-Jalali, the Akber-ul-Akhyar, the Rauzat-ul-Ahbab, Maraij-ul-Walayat, Manaqabi Qutbi, the Siyar-ul-Aqtar, the Siyar-ul-Arifeen and the Manaqib-ul-Asifya. These manuscripts are held by Bukhari Sayyids, however the work Marat-e-Jalali was first published in 1918 in book form from Allahabad, India and its second edition with updates and more research material was printed as a book in 1999 from Karachi, Pakistan. His descendants are called Naqvi al-Bukhari. However, this book is heavily critiqued due to having names and family trees mixed up. Furthermore, the author a police officer claimed Bukhari lineage but did not know his own bloodline which he claimed to be of Bukhari lineage.

In Kannauj there is a famous Mosque in the name of Bukhari's son Makhdoom  Jahaniyan Jahangasht. It was built by Jahaniyan's descendant and Sikandar Lodi’s advisor Syed Sadarudin Shah Kabir Naqvi Al Bukhari. This mosque is lauded for its aesthetic blend of architectural styles.

There are a number of tombs of Bukhari descendants across Punjab, Sindh, Indian Gujrat, Khyber Pakhtunkhwa and Uttar Pradesh in India. They include: Jahaniyan Jahangasht (d. 1308 CE). Famous Chishti Saint, Pir Syed Ghulam Haider Ali Shah of Jalalpur Sharif(Jhelum). Makhdum Jahaniyan Kannauj Tomb, Baba Shah Jamal and Meeran Muhammad Shah aka Mauj Darya Bukhari in Lahore, Baba Shah Saleem and Shah Nazar in Sialkot District and Rajan Qittal, Sayyed Tomb in Abdullapur Meerut, Bibi Jawindi (c. 1492 CE), Bukhari's great-granddaughter and Mir Mohammad Masoom, the forefather of the Bokhari Naqvi family of Dreg, Dera Ghazi Khan and Channan Pir and Wadpagga Sharif in Peshawar. Some moved to Kamalia and Sandhilianwali side then to Depalpur tehsil Dhole and then Firozpur During the 1850s with their Sikh friends they migrated to Sri Mukstar Sahib region of Ferozpur region such as Kabbarwala, Fattanwala, Bahmniwala and Fazilka India. They then migrated back into the present-day Pakistan area mainly resettling in Dipalpur tehsil and abroad but initially travelled outwards from the headquarters of Uch. Descendants of this family travelled across vast lands from Delhi, Bukhara and Mecca. Great Grandson of Hz. Jahaniya Jahangasht Qazi Husamuddin Hasan Bukhari in Allahabad (Old Kara Manikpur) in Uttar Pradesh India  and his descendants are presently found in Chail known as Naqvi Bukhari Syeds.

The tomb of Bibi Jawindi and the tomb and mosque of Jalaluddin Bukhari have been on the "tentative" list of UNESCO World Heritage Sites since 2004. World Monuments Fund also promotes its conservation.

He also had a son called Syed Ahmad Kabir who moved to Makkah. Kabir's sister, Syeda Haseenah Fatimah, was the mother of Shah Jalal.

Family lineage
According to Mara'at Jalali, Malfuzul Makhdoom, and Gulzar e Mustafvi first edition (authored by Syed Karam Ali Shah Bukhari Dholvi) Bukhari's lineage is:
 Jalaluddin Surkh-Posh Bukhari
 Ali Al-Moayad
 Ameer Shah
 Ja’far
 Muhammad Abu al Fateh
 Mahmood
 Ahmed
 Abdullah
 Ali Al Asghar
 Ja'far ibn Ali al-Hadi (Samarra)
 Ali al-Hadi
 Muhammad al-Jawad
 Ali al-Ridha
 Musa al-Kadhim
 Ja'far al-Sadiq
 Muhammad al-Baqir
 Ali ibn Husayn Zayn al-Abidin
 Husayn ibn Ali
 Ali ibn Abi-Talib

See also
 Sharfuddin Shah Wilayat
 List of mausolea and shrines in Pakistan
Syed
Bukhari

References 

1198 births
1292 deaths
Indian people of Arab descent
Indian Sufi saints
Shrines in Pakistan